Bryan Lones (born 13 April 1964) is a South African cricketer. He played in 43 first-class and 36 List A matches from 1985/86 to 1993/94.

References

External links
 

1964 births
Living people
South African cricketers
Border cricketers
Eastern Province cricketers
Cricketers from East London, Eastern Cape